Colias nina, Fawcett's clouded yellow, is a small butterfly of the family Pieridae - that is, the yellows and whites - that is found in India.

See also
List of butterflies of India
List of butterflies of India (Pieridae)

References

 
  
 
 
 

nina
Butterflies of Asia
Butterflies described in 1904